In computing jargon, the bit bucket (or byte bucket) is where lost computerized data has gone, by any means; any data which does not end up where it is supposed to, being lost in transmission, a computer crash, or the like, is said to have gone to the bit bucket – that mysterious place on a computer where lost data goes, as in:

History
Originally, the bit bucket was the container on teletype machines or IBM key punch machines into which chad from the paper tape punch or card punch was deposited; the formal name is "chad box" or (at IBM) "chip box". The term was then generalized into any place where useless bits go, a useful computing concept known as the null device. The term bit bucket is also used in discussions of bit shift operations.

The bit bucket is related to the first in never out buffer and write-only memory, in a joke datasheet issued by Signetics in 1972.

In a 1988 April Fool's article in Compute! magazine, Atari BASIC author Bill Wilkinson presented a POKE that implemented what he called a "WORN" (Write Once, Read Never) device, "a close relative of the WORM".

In programming languages the term is used to denote a bitstream which does not consume any computer resources, such as CPU or memory, by discarding any data "written" to it. In .NET Framework-based languages, it is the System.IO.Stream.Null.

See also
 Black hole (networking)
 Waste container metaphors

References

External links

 Bit Bucket entry from The Jargon File (version 4.4.7)

Computer jargon
Punched card